Bless This House may refer to:

 Bless This House (UK TV series), a 1971–1976 British sitcom
 Bless This House (film), a 1972 film spin-off of the above
 Bless This House (U.S. TV series), a 1995–1996 American sitcom
 "Bless This House" (song), a 1927 song written by Helen Taylor